"Yar demedin" (Sevdiğim bir gün bana) is a popular Turkish folk tune. It is a form of türkü. The meter is .There are similar folkloric tunes known as Bahar geldi gül açtı. Its music was composed and lyrics written by Yavuz Top.

References

Turkish songs
Year of song missing